Phoenix rising originally describes the heraldic position of the image of a phoenix: its head upturned (to its right) with wings raised for flight. The term can also refer to:

Film and television 
 Phoenix Rising (Hong Kong TV series), a 2007 Hong Kong period drama series
 "Phoenix Rising" (Babylon 5), an episode of Babylon 5
 "Phoenix Rising" (Eureka), an episode of Eureka
 Phoenix Rising, a 2006 film featuring Leo Laporte
 Phoenix Rising (American TV series), a 2022 American documentary series

Music 
 Phoenix Rising (band), a symphonic power metal band from Spain
 Phoenix Rising (Artension album), 1997
 Phoenix Rising (The Temptations album), 1998
 Phoenix Rising, an album released in by Deströyer 666
 Phoenix Rising (Galneryus album), 2011
 Phoenix Rising (Deep Purple album), a 2011 combo CD/DVD live album by Deep Purple
 "Phoenix Rising", a song by Annihilator on the album Set the World on Fire
 Phoenix Arising, composition for bassoon and piano by Graham Waterhouse, 2008

Other uses
 Phoenix Rising (novel), a 1994 young-adult novel by Karen Hesse
 Phoenix Rising (series), a trilogy of children's novels by Erica Verrillo
 Phoenix Rising FC, a United Soccer League team in Phoenix, Arizona
 Phoenix Rising Esports, the premier esports organization for competitive Heroes of the Storm